Gunter Schmidt (born 22 November 1938) is a German sexologist, psychotherapist and social psychologist. He was born in Berlin.

Schmidt was the director of the  centre for sexual research in the clinic of the University Medical Center Hamburg-Eppendorf (Eppendorf). He started many projects for research over sexuality and biographies. He was  a director of the Deutsche Gesellschaft für Sexualforschung (DGfS) and president of International Academy of Sex Research (IASR).

He is the director of a research project Pregnancy and Abortion by Young Women and  
a member of the board of directors for the organisation pro familia, an NGO for sexual and reproductive health and rights in Germany.

Together with Martin Dannecker and Volkmar Sigusch, he is editor of Beiträge zur Sexualforschung (87 editions which is published by Psychosozial-Verlag. Schmidt is also co-editor of the magazine Zeitschrift für Sexualforschung in the Georg Thieme Verlag.

Schmidt has written extensively on the sociological status of pedophilia in modern society.

Books 
 Studenten-Sexualität (with Hans Giese), 1968
 Arbeiter-Sexualität (with Volkmar Sigusch), 1971
 Jugendsexualität (with Volkmar Sigusch), 1973
 Das große Der Die Das, 1986.
 Das Verschwinden der Sexualmoral, 1996.
 Sexuelle Verhältnisse, Gießen, Psychosozial-Verlag, 1998.
 Die Kinder der sexuellen Revolution (editor), Gießen, Psychosozial-Verlag, 2000.
 Sexualität und Spätmoderne (editor), Gießen, Psychosozial-Verlag, 2002.
 Das neue Der Die Das, Gießen, Psychosozial-Verlag, 2004.
 Spätmoderne Beziehungswelten,  (with Silja Matthiesen, Arne Dekker, Kurt Starke), 2006.

References

External links 
 Literature by Gunter Schmidt in German National Library
 Beziehungsbiographien
 Jugendschwangerschaften

1938 births
German psychologists
German sexologists
Living people
People from Berlin
Psychology writers
German psychotherapists
Social psychologists